Noli Principe Manalang (born 1980) is a Filipino artist from Bulacan province, the Philippines. Although a graduate of Architecture from the Royal Pontifical University of Santo Tomas in 2000, he is known for acrylic and watercolor paintings of traditional Roman Catholic imagery inspired by his alma mater. He has been embellishing three-dimensional church artworks with his kind of realism, including one given to a chapel in the Czech Republic by the Philippine Chargé d’affaires in 2017.

Manalang is multi-awarded, receiving prizes from, among others, the Vermont Studio Center, Metrobank, and the Art Association of the Philippines. Apart from variously exhibiting in Metro Manila, he has also exhibited in New York City and at the Vermont Studio Center in Johnson, Vermont.

Some of Manalang's works have been auctioned on Artnet and MutualArt, and have been represented by galleries in the Philippines including Altro Mondo.

In 2019, he was chosen to be a part of diskurso.com's Apropiación show.

Manalang is a multi-awarded artist; his hometown province of Bulacan bestowed on him the honor “Gintong Kabataan for Visual Arts” (Golden Youth for Visual Arts), an award he holds dear to his heart because the recognition is a fitting tribute to all his hard work and art advocacies nurtured by his idyllic birthplace. His profound body of works speaks not only of the contemporary metacognition of the Filipino psyche but also mirrors the diverse cultural influences of the nation presented in an arresting visual approach. Manalang was elevated to the Hall of Fame in the ‘Kulay sa Tubig’ Annual Invitational Watercolor Competition, the Philippines’ premier watercolor contest, for winning in three consecutive years. His singular talent in jewelry design was also recognized during the 6th Hiyas Jewelry Design and Manufacturing Competition and was hailed as one of the emerging jewelry artists of his generation. He is also a constant fixture in the winner circle of the Art Association of the Philippines’ Annual Art Competition, Metrobank Art and Design Excellence Competition, Philip Morris’ Philippine Art Awards, GSIS Painting Competition, NCCA Diwa ng Sining Award, and Shell National Students Art Competition to name a few.  He is also a recipient of an art residency program from the Freeman Foundation’s Asian Artists Fellowship in Vermont USA.
Noli Principe Manalang also dabbles in ecclesiastical jewelry and vestment art, creating iconic pieces in collaboration with respected artists in the field. He is at the forefront of reviving this slowly dying cultural tradition. Such are his works, whose driving passion is to create art that touches the lives of the viewer and reconnects the on-looker with the Divine. 
Manalang was chosen to represent the Philippines to the XVI Florence Biennale 2023 at Fortezza de Basso happening on October 12-24, 2023

References

Artists from Bulacan
21st-century Filipino painters
People from Manila
University of Santo Tomas alumni
Living people
1980 births